Larbi Bouriah (born 24 February 1983) is an Algerian table tennis player. He competed in the 2020 Summer Olympics. He finished in 49th place after losing to Bence Majoros of Hungary in the first round of the men's singles.

References

1983 births
Living people
Sportspeople from Créteil
Table tennis players at the 2020 Summer Olympics
Algerian male table tennis players
Olympic table tennis players of Algeria
African Games competitors for Algeria
Competitors at the 2019 African Games
French sportspeople of Algerian descent